The 2017–18 Welsh Premier League was the ninth season of the Women's Welsh Premier League, the top level women's football league in Wales. The season began on 3 September 2017 and ended on 2 May 2018.

Cardiff Metropolitan Ladies won their fifth league title, five points clear of the previous season's winners Swansea City. The Premier League Cup was won by Cyncoed Ladies, the first piece of silverware that the team had won. Swansea City won the FAW Women's Cup – the third time that they have won the trophy.

Lyndsey Davies of Abergavenny Women won the Golden Boot for the second season in a row after scoring 22 goals.

Player of the Season was won by Cardiff City's Shannon Evans and Young Player of the Season was awarded to Ellie Lake of Swansea City.

Clubs

One of the league's founding teams Caernarfon Town were promoted back to the Premier League and Caldicot Town played their first season in the top flight. 10 teams ended up competing in the league.

Standings

Awards

Monthly awards

Annual awards

League Cup
This was the fifth season of the WPWL Cup and Cyncoed Ladies won the competition for the first time in their history. Cyncoed beat Cardiff Metropolitan 1-0 after extra time. Jasmine Simpson of Cardiff Metropolitan scored the most goals in the competition with 4 in 4 games.

Round one

Quarter-finals

Semi-finals

Final

References

External links
Welsh Premier Women's League

2016-17
Wales Women